Western Yugur (Western Yugur:  (Yugur speech) or  (Yugur word)) also known as Neo-Uygur is the Turkic language spoken by the Yugur people. It is contrasted with Eastern Yugur, a Mongolic language spoken within the same community. Traditionally, both languages are indicated by the term "Yellow Uygur", from the endonym of the Yugur.

There are approximately 4,600 Turkic-speaking Yugurs.

Classification
Besides similarities with Uyghuric languages, Western Yugur also shares a number of features, mainly archaisms, with several of the Northeastern Turkic languages, but it is not closer to any one of them in particular. Neither Western nor Eastern Yugur are mutually intelligible with Uyghur.

Western Yugur also contains archaisms which are attested in neither modern Uyghuric nor Siberian, such as its anticipating counting system coinciding with Old Uyghur, and its copula dro, which originated from Old Uyghur but substitutes the Uyghur copulative personal suffixes.

Geographic distribution
Speakers of Western Yugur reside primarily in the western part of Gansu province's Sunan Yugur Autonomous County.

Phonology
A special feature in Western Yugur is the occurrence of preaspiration, corresponding to the so-called pharyngealised or low vowels in Tuva and Tofa, and short vowels in Yakut and Turkmen.  Examples of this phenomenon include  "thirty",  "good", and  "meat".

The vowel harmony system, typical of Turkic languages, has largely collapsed. However, it still exists for a-suffixes (back a : front i), however for stems containing last close vowels are chosen unpredictably ( "knowing" vs.  "pushing"). Voice as a distinguishing feature in plosives and affricates was replaced by aspiration, as in Chinese.

Consonants
West Yugur has 28 native consonants and two more (indicated in parentheses) found only in loan words.

Vowels

Diachronical processes
Several sound changes affected Western Yugur phonology while evolving from its original Common Turkic form, the most prolific being:

Vowels
 High vowels were delabialized in non-initial syllables: CT *tütün > *tütin > WYu tuʰtïn "to smoke", CT *altun > *altïn > WYu aʰltïm "gold"
 CT *u was lowered to WYu o in some words, most commonly around velars and r: CT *burun > WYu pʰorn "before, front"
 All high vowels were merged – as front vowels in palatal contexts, and as back otherwise: CT *üčün > WYu utɕin "with, using", CT *yïlan > WYu yilan "snake"
 This had several consequences:
 It made the Common Turkic allophonic difference between *k and *q phonemic.
 Vowel harmonic class of resulting words was thus determined lexically in Western Yugur.
 Former vowel harmonic suffixes with high vowels became invariable: CT: *-Ki/*-Kï > WYu -Kï "attributive noun suffix"
 Front vowels *ä, *e, *ö were raised to *i, *ü except before *r, *l, *ŋ and (excluding *ö) *g: CT *ärän > WYu erin "man", CT *kȫk > WYu kük, CT *-lar/*-lär > WYu -lar/-lir "plural suffix"
 CT *ay is reflected as WYu ey~e in the initial syllable and as i otherwise.
 In the initial syllable exclusively, short vowels acquire pre-aspiration of the following consonant, length distinction is otherwise lost.

Consonants
 As in most Turkic language, initial *b was assimilated to *m in words containing nasals.
 Initial plosives and affricates, CT *b, *t, *k, *g, *č, are all reflected as voiceless with unpredictable aspiration: CT *temir > WYu temïr, CT *bog- > WYu pʰoɣ- "to tie with a rope"
 Labials are merged into *w intervocally and after liquids which later in some cases forms diphthongs or get elided: CT *yubaš > WYu yüwaʂ "calm", CT *harpa > WYu harwa "barley"
 Finally and in most consonant clusters *p is preserved and *b elided.
 Dental and velar voiceless plosives are preserved in most positions, with aspiration occurring almost exclusively in the initial position.
 CT *g is spirantized into ɣ and CT *d into z.
 With some exceptions, CT *š develops into s: CT *tāš > WYu tas "stone"
 CT *z is preserved, except for devoicing when final in polysyllabic words: CT *otuz > WYu oʰtïs "thirty"
 CT *č generally becomes WYu š in syllable codas.
 CT *ñ develops into WYu y; initial CT *y- is mostly preserved; CT *h- is seemingly preserved in some words but the extent to which WYu h- corresponds to it is unclear.

Vocabulary
Western Yugur is the only Turkic language that preserved the anticipating counting system, known from Old Turkic. In this system, upper decimals are used, i.e. per otus (per: one, otus: thirty) means "one (on the way to) thirty", is 21.

For centuries, the Western Yugur language has been in contact with Mongolic languages, Tibetan, and Chinese, and as a result has adopted a large amount of loanwords from these languages, as well as grammatical features. Chinese dialects neighboring the areas where Yugur is spoken have influenced the Yugur language, giving it loanwords.

Grammar
Personal markers in nouns as well as in verbs were largely lost. In the verbal system, the notion of evidentiality has been grammaticalised, seemingly under the influence of Tibetan.

Grammatical cases

Four kinship terms have distinct vocative forms, and used when calling out loudly: aqu (← aqa "elder brother"), qïzaqu (← qïzaqa "elder sister"), açu (← aça "father"), and anu (← ana "mother"). There are two possessive suffixes, first and second person -(ï)ŋ and third person -(s)ï, but these suffixes are largely not used outside of kinship terms (anaŋ, anasï "mother"), similar to the concept of inalienable possessions. Four kinship nouns have irregular 1st and 2nd person forms by eliding the final vowel and using the consonantic variant: aqa → aqïŋ "elder brother".

Writing system

Grigory Potanin recorded a glossary of Salar language, Western Yugur language, and Eastern Yugur language in his 1893 Russian language book The Tangut-Tibetan Borderlands of China and Central Mongolia.

History

Modern Uyghur and Western Yugur belong to entirely different branches of the Turkic language family, respectively the Karluk languages spoken in the Kara-Khanid Khanate (such as the Xākānī language described in Mahmud al-Kashgari's Dīwān al-Luġat al-Turk) and the Siberian Turkic languages, which include Old Uyghur.

The Yugur are descended from the Ganzhou Uyghur Kingdom, Qocho and the Uyghur Khaganate.

References

Bibliography

 
 Chén Zōngzhèn & Léi Xuǎnchūn. 1985. Xībù Yùgùyǔ Jiānzhì [Concise grammar of Western Yugur]. Peking.
 
 Léi Xuǎnchūn (proofread by Chén Zōngzhèn). 1992. Xībù Yùgù Hàn Cídiǎn [Western Yugur - Chinese Dictionary]. Chéngdu.
 Malov, S. E. 1957. Jazyk zheltykh ujgurov. Slovar' i grammatika. Alma Ata.
 Malov, S. E. 1967. Jazyk zheltykh ujgurov. Teksty i perevody. Moscow.
 
 Roos, Marti, Hans Nugteren, Zhong Jìnwén. 1999. On some Turkic proverbs of the Western and Eastern Yugur languages. Turkic Languages'' 3.2: 189–214.
 Tenishev, È. R. 1976. Stroj saryg-jugurskogo jazyka. Moscow.

External links

 Slide Shows and maps of author Eric Enno Tamm's visit to Lianhua and Hongwansi
"Western Yugur Steppe" – A collection of literature and linguistic information 
 The Tangut-Tibetan Borderlands of China and Central Mongolia by Grigory Potanin (Russian)

Agglutinative languages
Uyghurs
Siberian Turkic languages
Languages of China
Turkic languages